Iganga General Hospital, also, Iganga District Hospital or Iganga Main Hospital, commonly known as Nakavule Hospital is a hospital in Iganga, Eastern Uganda.

Location
The coordinates of Iganga General Hospital are: 0°36'57.0"N, 33°29'04.0"E (Latitude:0.615828; Longitude:33.484431).

Overview
Iganga General Hospital is a 100-bed, government-owned hospital. It serves Iganga District and parts of the districts of Luuka, Mayuge, Bugiri, Namutumba and Kaliro. It was built in 1968. Over the years, the underfunded, understaffed hospital's infrastructure has deteriorated and the hospital equipment has aged and become antiquated. The overworked staff are underpaid and of low morale.

Renovations
In 2013 the Uganda Ministry of Health, using a loan of $195 million from the World Bank, began renovating a number of hospitals including this hospital. The renovation work was complete by November 2015.

See also
List of hospitals in Uganda

References

External links
 Website of Uganda Ministry of Health

Hospitals in Uganda
Iganga District
 Busoga
Eastern Region, Uganda
1968 establishments in Uganda